Bristol Rovers F.C. spent the 1989–90 season in the Football League Third Division.

League table

Bris
Bristol Rovers F.C. seasons